Conserved oligomeric Golgi complex subunit 3 is a protein that in humans is encoded by the COG3 gene.

The protein encoded by this gene has similarity to a yeast protein. It seems to be part of a peripheral membrane protein complex localized on cis/medial Golgi cisternae where it may participate in tethering intra-Golgi transport vesicles.

Interactions 

COG3 has been shown to interact with COG2 and COG1.

References

External links

Further reading